Wolde is a municipality in the district of Demmin, in Mecklenburg-Vorpommern, Germany.

Wolde may also refer to:

People 
People with name Wolde (meaning "Child of" in Geʽez):
 Abba Samuel Wolde Kahin (died 1915), Ethiopian academic
 Dawit Wolde (born 1991), Ethiopian middle-distance runner
 Demissie Wolde (born 1937), Ethiopian former marathon runner
 Ellen van Wolde (born 1954)
 Goshu Wolde (born 1942)
 Gunilla Wolde (1939–2015), Swedish writer and illustrator
 Mamo Wolde (1932–2002), Ethiopian long distance track and road running athlete
 Million Wolde (born 1979), Ethiopian long-distance runner
 Wolde Giyorgis Wolde Yohannes (1901–1976), Ethiopian politician
 Wolde Harris (born 1974), Jamaican soccer striker
 Wolde Selassie (died 1816), Ras of Ethiopia and warlord of Tigray
 Yared Wolde (born 1968), Ethiopian boxer

See also
 De Wolde
 Wolde-Giorgis
 Wolde Giyorgis
 Woldemichael
 Woldemariam

Masculine given names
Amharic-language names